Animal Face-Off is an American television program that aired on the Discovery Channel and Animal Planet in 2004.

Synopsis
This program, produced by NHNZ, centers on hypothetical battles between two animals that could meet in the wild, or, in some cases, have been compared to each other by scientists. CGI replicas and models were used to collect data (such as strength, bite force, etc.) about the animals. Then, in a virtual arena, a brief computer-animated fight scene reveals the results. Some people have declared this show similar to the hit Spike TV show Deadliest Warrior. Since the fights are created artificially, results in real life may vary. Each episode of Animal Face-Off is one hour long, with the exception of the 12th episode, which is two hours long.

Episodes

Reruns

The show was rerun on the Discovery Channel in the mid-2000s under the "Wild Discovery" branding.

The show currently airs in reruns on Quest.

Notes

References

2000s American documentary television series
2004 American television series debuts
2004 American television series endings
Animal Planet original programming
Fiction about death games
Discovery Channel original programming
Television series about mammals